Danielle Nicole Schmiemann (born May 29, 1996) is a Canadian curler from Edmonton, Alberta. She currently plays third on Team Kelsey Rocque. She is originally from Sundre, Alberta but later moved to and graduated from high school in Stony Plain, Alberta.

Career
Schmiemann started at the University of Alberta in 2014, joining the Pandas Curling Program. She played within the program throughout the entirety of her University Degree and now joins a group of very successful Bears and Pandas alumni, including all three of her current teammates Kelsey Rocque, Dana Ferguson and Rachelle Brown.

In 2015, Schmiemann joined the Kelsey Rocque rink of Rocque, Holly Jamieson and Jesse Iles. The team won the Alberta Junior Curling Championship, earning her and her team a berth at the 2015 Canadian Junior Curling Championships in Corner Brook, Newfoundland and Labrador. There, the team went 9–1 in the round robin giving them a birth to the final, where they won against Ontario's Chelsea Brandwood 8–2. The team represented Canada at the 2015 World Junior Curling Championships, where they would go undefeated en route to claiming the title. Rocque aged out of juniors following the season and Schmiemann joined the Kristen Streifel rink at third. The team won one tour event, the Crestwood Ladies Fall Classic. At the Alberta Junior Provincials, the team lost the semifinal and would not go to the 2016 Canadian Junior Curling Championships. Later that season, Schmiemann played with Rocque and represented the Alberta Pandas at the 2016 CIS/CCA Curling Championships where they defeated the Thompson Rivers WolfPack skipped by Corryn Brown in the final.

Schmiemann chose not to play in her final year of juniors as the 2017 Alberta Junior Provincials and Canadian Junior Curling Championships conflicted with the 2017 Winter Universiade. Because of this, she began skipping her own team for the 2016–17 season. The team failed to qualify for the playoffs in any tour events. With their win at the 2016 CIS/CCA Curling Championships earlier the previous year, Schmiemann would play with Rocque at the 2017 Winter Universiade where they would once again find success winning the Gold Medal for Canada. She played in the U Sports/Curling Canada University Curling Championships again in 2018 representing the University of Alberta where they won the title once again alongside teammates Kristen Streifel, Selena Sturmay, Jesse Iles and Paige Papley. This would set them up to represent Canada once again at the 2019 Winter Universiade in Krasnoyarsk, Russia.  Shortly after this win, Schmiemann would join Rocque as an official team in 2018, with Becca Konschuh at second and Jesse Iles at lead. They made the quarterfinals at the Tour Challenge Tier 2 Grand Slam of Curling event and finished runner-up at the 2019 Alberta Scotties Tournament of Hearts to Chelsea Carey. She then played with Streifel at the 2019 Winter Universiade where they lost to Sophie Jackson from Great Britain in the qualification game. Schmiemann was also chosen to be the flag bearer for the entirety of Team Canada at this Universiade.

Team Rocque had a strong 2019–20 season, starting it off with a semifinal finish at the 2019 Cameron's Brewing Oakville Fall Classic. The team qualified for the playoffs at the 2019 Tour Challenge Grand Slam event where they lost to eventual winners Anna Hasselborg. Going into the 2020 Alberta Scotties Tournament of Hearts, Rocque was the number one seeded team, earning their spot through the CTRS points leader berth. They went 6–1 through the round robin, with their only loss to the Laura Walker. They would play Walker again in the 1 vs. 2 game where they lost 7–1. They had a strong semifinal game, able to easily defeat Krysta Hilker 8–1 setting up the third match for Rocque and Walker during the competition. The team struggled during the final, not able to figure out the ice and losing the final for the second straight year in a row. It would be the team's last event of the season as both the Players' Championship and the Champions Cup Grand Slam events were cancelled due to the COVID-19 pandemic. On March 18, 2020, it was announced that both Becca Hebert and Jesse Marlow would be leaving the team. Rocque and Schmiemann then announced on March 21 that Dana Ferguson and Rachelle Brown would be joining them for the 2020–21 season.

Due to the pandemic, most of the tour events during the 2020–21 season were cancelled. Team Rocque played only one competitive game together during the entire season at the Okotoks Ladies Classic in November. After the first draw, the event was cancelled due to a province-wide shutdown in Alberta. Due to the COVID-19 pandemic in Alberta, the 2021 provincial championship was also cancelled. As the reigning provincials champions, Team Laura Walker were chosen to represent Alberta at the 2021 Scotties Tournament of Hearts. However, due to many provinces cancelling their provincial championships as a result of the COVID-19 pandemic in Canada, Curling Canada added three Wild Card teams to the national championship, which were based on the CTRS standings from the 2019–20 season. Team Rocque was one of the top three non-qualified teams, but they did not retain at least three of their four players from the previous season, meaning they could not qualify for the national championship.

In their first event of the 2021–22 season, Team Rocque reached the quarterfinals of the 2021 Alberta Curling Series: Saville Shoot-Out. Due to the pandemic, the qualification process for the 2021 Canadian Olympic Curling Trials had to be modified to qualify enough teams for the championship. In these modifications, Curling Canada created the 2021 Canadian Curling Trials Direct-Entry Event, an event where five teams would compete to try to earn one of three spots into the 2021 Canadian Olympic Curling Trials. Team Rocque qualified for the Trials Direct-Entry Event due to their CTRS ranking from the 2019–20 season. At the event, the team went 3–1 through the round robin, enough to secure their spot at the Olympic Trials. Next, Team Rocque played in both the 2021 Masters and the 2021 National Grand Slam events. After failing to reach the playoffs at the Masters, the team made it all the way to the semifinals of the National where they were defeated by Tracy Fleury. It was the furthest the team had ever advanced in a Grand Slam event. A few weeks later, they competed in the Olympic Trials, held November 20 to 28 in Saskatoon, Saskatchewan. At the event, the team began by losing five of their first six games. They then won their final two games, which included a victory over Kerri Einarson, to finish in seventh place with a 3–5 record. In their final game against Einarson, the team shot a high 95% which included a 99% game by Schmiemann. Team Rocque then competed in the 2022 Alberta Scotties Tournament of Hearts, where they posted a 6–1 record through the round robin. This created a three-way tie between Rocque, Laura Walker and the Casey Scheidegger rink, however, as Walker had to best draw shot challenge between the three rinks, they advanced directly to the final. In the semifinal, Team Rocque fell 10–7 to Team Scheidegger, eliminating them from contention. On March 21, 2022, the team announced that they would be staying together despite the Olympic quadrennial coming to an end.

Schmiemann also competes in the Mixed Doubles discipline with her partner, Jason Ginter. Together they won the 2017 Alberta Mixed Doubles Provincial Championship and would go onto to lose a tie-breaker at the 2017 Canadian Mixed Doubles Curling Championship. They made their second appearance at the Nationals in 2019 in Fredericton, New Brunswick where they finished with a record of 4-3 but failed to qualify for playoffs. They had qualified for the 2020 Canadian Mixed Doubles Curling Championship to be held in Portage La Prairie before it was cancelled due to the coronavirus pandemic. In 2021, Schmiemann competed in her third mixed doubles national championship when she replaced a pregnant Rachel Homan as John Morris' partner at the 2021 Canadian Mixed Doubles Curling Championship. The pair finished the round robin with a 5–1 record and defeated the number one seeds Laura Walker and Kirk Muyres to qualify for the 1 vs. 2 page playoff game. They then lost both the 1 vs. 2 game and the semifinal to earn the bronze medal.

Personal life
Schmiemann graduated from the University of Alberta in 2018 with a Bachelors of Science in Kinesiology,  and also attended MacEwan University completing her Acupuncture Diploma. She works as an Acupuncturist for Acupuncture Turning Point. She is in a relationship with Jason Ginter.

Teams

References

External links

Canadian women curlers
Curlers from Edmonton
Living people
Universiade medalists in curling
Universiade gold medalists for Canada
Competitors at the 2017 Winter Universiade
Competitors at the 2019 Winter Universiade
1996 births
University of Alberta alumni
People from Olds, Alberta
20th-century Canadian women
21st-century Canadian women